Tremont Mill Pond is a  pond in Wareham, Massachusetts, in the West Wareham section of town. The Weweantic River flows through the pond. Route 28 runs north of the pond. Tremont village is located southwest of the pond. The water quality is impaired due to non-native fish in the pond.

External links
Environmental Protection Agency

Wareham, Massachusetts
Ponds of Plymouth County, Massachusetts
Ponds of Massachusetts